Athens ((pl.) ) is a major coastal city in the Mediterranean and is both the capital and largest city of Greece. With its surrounding urban area’s population numbering over three million, it is also the seventh largest urban area in the European Union. Athens dominates and is the capital of the Attica region and is one of the world's oldest cities, with its recorded history spanning over 3,400 years and its earliest human presence beginning somewhere between the 11th and 7th millennia BCE.

Classical Athens was a powerful city-state. It was a centre for the arts, learning and philosophy, and the home of Plato's Academy and Aristotle's Lyceum. It is widely referred to as the cradle of Western civilization and the birthplace of democracy, largely because of its cultural and political influence on the European continent—particularly Ancient Rome. In modern times, Athens is a large cosmopolitan metropolis and central to economic, financial, industrial, maritime, political and cultural life in Greece. In 2023, Athens' surrounding metropolitan area had a population of 3.1 million.

Athens is a Beta-status global city according to the Globalization and World Cities Research Network, and is one of the biggest economic centers in Southeastern Europe. It also has a large financial sector, and its port Piraeus is both the largest passenger port in Europe, and the third largest in the world.

Athens is also the southernmost capital on the European mainland and the warmest major city in continental Europe with an average annual temperature of up to  locally.

The heritage of the Classical Era is still evident in the city, represented by ancient monuments, and works of art, the most famous of all being the Parthenon, considered a key landmark of early Western civilization. The city also retains Roman, Byzantine and a smaller number of Ottoman monuments, while its historical urban core features elements of continuity through its millennia of history. Athens is home to two UNESCO World Heritage Sites, the Acropolis of Athens and the medieval Daphni Monastery. Landmarks of the modern era, dating back to the establishment of Athens as the capital of the independent Greek state in 1834, include the Hellenic Parliament and the so-called "Architectural Trilogy of Athens", consisting of the National Library of Greece, the National and Kapodistrian University of Athens, and the Academy of Athens. Athens is also home to several museums and cultural institutions, such as the National Archeological Museum, featuring the world's largest collection of ancient Greek antiquities, the Acropolis Museum, the Museum of Cycladic Art, the Benaki Museum, and the Byzantine and Christian Museum. Athens was the host city of the first modern-day Olympic Games in 1896, and 108 years later it hosted the 2004 Summer Olympics, making it one of the few cities to have hosted the Olympics more than once. Athens joined the UNESCO Global Network of Learning Cities in 2016.

Etymology and names

The root of the word is probably not of Greek or Indo-European origin, and is possibly a remnant of the Pre-Greek substrate of Attica. In antiquity, it was debated whether Athens took its name from its patron goddess Athena (Attic , Athēnâ, Ionic , Athḗnē, and Doric , Athā́nā) or Athena took her name from the city. Modern scholars now generally agree that the goddess takes her name from the city, because the ending -ene is common in names of locations, but rare for personal names.

According to the ancient Athenian founding myth, Athena, the goddess of wisdom and war, competed against Poseidon, the God of the Seas, for patronage of the yet-unnamed city; they agreed that whoever gave the Athenians the better gift would become their patron and appointed Cecrops, the king of Athens, as the judge. According to the account given by Pseudo-Apollodorus, Poseidon struck the ground with his trident and a salt water spring welled up. In an alternative version of the myth from Vergil's poem Georgics, Poseidon instead gave the Athenians the first horse. In both versions, Athena offered the Athenians the first domesticated olive tree. Cecrops accepted this gift and declared Athena the patron goddess of Athens. Eight different etymologies, now commonly rejected, have been proposed since the 17th century. Ludwig von Döderlein proposed the stem of the verb , stem θη- (tháō, thē-, "to suck") to denote Athens as having fertile soil. Athenians were called cicada-wearers because they used to wear pins of golden cicadas. A symbol of being autochthonous (earth-born), because the legendary founder of Athens, Erechtheus was an autochthon or of being musicians, because the cicada is a "musician" insect.

Variant names included Setines, Satine, and Astines, all derivations involving false splitting of prepositional phrases. King Alphonse X of Castile gives the pseudo-etymology 'the one without death/ignorance'. In Ottoman Turkish, it was called  Ātīnā, and in modern Turkish, it is Atina.

After the establishment of the modern Greek state, and partly due to the conservatism of the written language,   again became the official name of the city and remained so until the abandonment of Katharevousa in the 1970s, when Ἀθήνα, Athína, became the official name. Today, it is often simply called  ī protévousa; 'the capital'.

History 

The oldest known human presence in Athens is the Cave of Schist, which has been dated to between the 11th and 7th millennia BCE. Athens has been continuously inhabited for at least 5,000 years (3000 BCE). By 1400 BCE, the settlement had become an important centre of the Mycenaean civilization, and the Acropolis was the site of a major Mycenaean fortress, whose remains can be recognised from sections of the characteristic Cyclopean walls. Unlike other Mycenaean centers, such as Mycenae and Pylos, it is not known whether Athens suffered destruction in about 1200 BCE, an event often attributed to a Dorian invasion, and the Athenians always maintained that they were pure Ionians with no Dorian element. However, Athens, like many other Bronze Age settlements, went into economic decline for around 150 years afterwards.

Iron Age burials, in the Kerameikos and other locations, are often richly provided for and demonstrate that from 900 BCE onwards Athens was one of the leading centres of trade and prosperity in the region. The leading position of Athens may well have resulted from its central location in the Greek world, its secure stronghold on the Acropolis and its access to the sea, which gave it a natural advantage over inland rivals such as Thebes and Sparta.

By the sixth century BCE, widespread social unrest led to the reforms of Solon. These would pave the way for the eventual introduction of democracy by Cleisthenes in 508 BCE. Athens had by this time become a significant naval power with a large fleet, and helped the rebellion of the Ionian cities against Persian rule. In the ensuing Greco-Persian Wars Athens, together with Sparta, led the coalition of Greek states that would eventually repel the Persians, defeating them decisively at Marathon in 490 BCE, and crucially at Salamis in 480 BCE. However, this did not prevent Athens from being captured and sacked twice by the Persians within one year, after a heroic but ultimately failed resistance at Thermopylae by Spartans and other Greeks led by King Leonidas, after both Boeotia and Attica fell to the Persians.

The decades that followed became known as the Golden Age of Athenian democracy, during which time Athens became the leading city of Ancient Greece, with its cultural achievements laying the foundations for Western civilization. The playwrights Aeschylus, Sophocles and Euripides flourished in Athens during this time, as did the historians Herodotus and Thucydides, the physician Hippocrates, and the philosopher Socrates. Guided by Pericles, who promoted the arts and fostered democracy, Athens embarked on an ambitious building program that saw the construction of the Acropolis of Athens (including the Parthenon), as well as empire-building via the Delian League. Originally intended as an association of Greek city-states to continue the fight against the Persians, the league soon turned into a vehicle for Athens's own imperial ambitions. The resulting tensions brought about the Peloponnesian War (431–404 BCE), in which Athens was defeated by its rival Sparta.

By the mid-4th century BCE, the northern Greek kingdom of Macedon was becoming dominant in Athenian affairs. In 338 BCE the armies of Philip II defeated an alliance of some of the Greek city-states including Athens and Thebes at the Battle of Chaeronea, effectively ending Athenian independence. Later, under Rome, Athens was given the status of a free city because of its widely admired schools. In the second century AD, The Roman emperor Hadrian, himself an Athenian citizen, ordered the construction of a library, a gymnasium, an aqueduct which is still in use, several temples and sanctuaries, a bridge and financed the completion of the Temple of Olympian Zeus.

By the end of Late Antiquity, Athens had shrunk due to sacks by the Herulians, Visigoths, and Early Slavs which caused massive destruction in the city. In this era, the first Christian churches were built in Athens, and the Parthenon and other temples were converted into churches. Athens expanded its settlement in the second half of the Middle Byzantine Period, in the ninth to tenth centuries AD, and was relatively prosperous during the Crusades, benefiting from Italian trade. After the Fourth Crusade the Duchy of Athens was established. In 1458, it was conquered by the Ottoman Empire and entered a long period of decline.

Following the Greek War of Independence and the establishment of the Greek Kingdom, Athens was chosen as the capital of the newly independent Greek state in 1834, largely because of historical and sentimental reasons. At the time, after the extensive destruction it had suffered during the war of independence, it was reduced to a town of about 4,000 people (less than half its earlier population) in a loose swarm of houses along the foot of the Acropolis. The first King of Greece, Otto of Bavaria, commissioned the architects Stamatios Kleanthis and Eduard Schaubert to design a modern city plan fit for the capital of a state.

The first modern city plan consisted of a triangle defined by the Acropolis, the ancient cemetery of Kerameikos and the new palace of the Bavarian king (now housing the Greek Parliament), so as to highlight the continuity between modern and ancient Athens. Neoclassicism, the international style of this epoch, was the architectural style through which Bavarian, French and Greek architects such as Hansen, Klenze, Boulanger or Kaftantzoglou designed the first important public buildings of the new capital. In 1896, Athens hosted the first modern Olympic Games. During the 1920s a number of Greek refugees, expelled from Asia Minor after the Greco-Turkish War and Greek genocide, swelled Athens's population; nevertheless it was most particularly following World War II, and from the 1950s and 1960s, that the population of the city exploded, and Athens experienced a gradual expansion.

In the 1980s, it became evident that smog from factories and an ever-increasing fleet of automobiles, as well as a lack of adequate free space due to congestion, had evolved into the city's most important challenge. A series of anti-pollution measures taken by the city's authorities in the 1990s, combined with a substantial improvement of the city's infrastructure (including the Attiki Odos motorway, the expansion of the Athens Metro, and the new Athens International Airport), considerably alleviated pollution and transformed Athens into a much more functional city. In 2004, Athens hosted the 2004 Summer Olympics.

Geography
Athens sprawls across the central plain of Attica that is often referred to as the Athens Basin or the Attica Basin. The basin is bounded by four large mountains: Mount Aigaleo to the west, Mount Parnitha to the north, Mount Pentelicus to the northeast and Mount Hymettus to the east. Beyond Mount Aegaleo lies the Thriasian plain, which forms an extension of the central plain to the west. The Saronic Gulf lies to the southwest. Mount Parnitha is the tallest of the four mountains, and has been declared a national park. The city is located in the north temperate zone, 38 degrees north of the equator.

Athens is built around a number of hills. Lycabettus is one of the tallest hills of the city proper and provides a view of the entire Attica Basin. The meteorology of Athens is deemed to be one of the most complex in the world because its mountains cause a temperature inversion phenomenon which, along with the Greek government's difficulties controlling industrial pollution, was responsible for the air pollution problems the city has faced. This issue is not unique to Athens; for instance, Los Angeles and Mexico City also suffer from similar atmospheric inversion problems.

The Cephissus river, the Ilisos and the Eridanos stream are the historical rivers of Athens.

Environment 

By the late 1970s, the pollution of Athens had become so destructive that according to the then Greek Minister of Culture, Constantine Trypanis, "...the carved details on the five the caryatids of the Erechtheum had seriously degenerated, while the face of the horseman on the Parthenon's west side was all but obliterated." A series of measures taken by the authorities of the city throughout the 1990s resulted in the improvement of air quality; the appearance of smog (or nefos as the Athenians used to call it) has become less common.

Measures taken by the Greek authorities throughout the 1990s have improved the quality of air over the Attica Basin. Nevertheless, air pollution still remains an issue for Athens, particularly during the hottest summer days. In late June 2007, the Attica region experienced a number of brush fires, including a blaze that burned a significant portion of a large forested national park in Mount Parnitha, considered critical to maintaining a better air quality in Athens all year round. Damage to the park has led to worries over a stalling in the improvement of air quality in the city.

The major waste management efforts undertaken in the last decade (particularly the plant built on the small island of Psytalia) have greatly improved water quality in the Saronic Gulf, and the coastal waters of Athens are now accessible again to swimmers.

Safety
Athens ranks in the lowest percentage for the risk on frequency and severity of terrorist attacks according to the EU Global Terrorism Database (EIU 2007–2016 calculations). The city also ranked 35th in Digital Security, 21st on Health Security, 29th on Infrastructure Security and 41st on Personal Security globally in a 2017 The Economist Intelligence Unit report. It also ranks as a very safe city (39th globally out of 162 cities overall) on the ranking of the safest and most dangerous countries. As May 2022 the crime index from Numbeo places Athens at 56.33 (moderate), while its safety index is at 43.68. According to a Mercer 2019 Quality of Living Survey, Athens ranks 89th on the Mercer Quality of Living Survey ranking.

Climate
Athens has a hot-summer Mediterranean climate (Köppen climate classification: Csa). Athens is the hottest city in mainland Europe
The dominant feature of Athens' climate is alternation between prolonged hot and dry summers and mild, wetter winters with moderate rainfall. July and August are the driest months when thunderstorms occur sparsely. Furthermore, some coastal areas such as Piraeus in the Athens Riviera, have a hot semi-arid climate (BSh) according to the climate atlas published by the Hellenic National Meteorological Service. However, places like Elliniko, which are classified as hot semi-arid (BSh) because of the low annual rainfall, have not recorded temperatures as high as other places in the city. This occurs due to the moderating influence of the sea, and lower levels of industrialisation compared to other regions of the city.

Owing to the rain shadow of the Pindus Mountains, annual precipitation of Athens is lower than most other parts of Greece, especially western Greece. Due to the large area covered by Athens Metropolitan Area, there are notable climatic differences between parts of the urban conglomeration. The northern suburbs tend to be wetter and cooler in winter, whereas the southern suburbs are some of the driest locations in Greece and record very high minimum temperatures in summer. The National Meteorological Service (EMY) described it was one of the most intense snow storms over the past 40 years. Heavy snow was also reported in Athens on January 24, 2022, with  reported locally in the higher elevations.

Athens is affected by the urban heat island effect in some areas which is caused by human activity, altering its temperatures compared to the surrounding rural areas, and leaving detrimental effects on energy usage, expenditure for cooling, and health. The urban heat island of the city has also been found to be partially responsible for alterations of the climatological temperature time-series of specific Athens meteorological stations, because of its effect on the temperatures and the temperature trends recorded by some meteorological stations. On the other hand, specific meteorological stations, such as the National Garden station and Thiseio meteorological station, are less affected or do not experience the urban heat island.

Furthermore, Metropolitan Athens has experienced temperatures of 47.5°C and over in four different locations.

Locations

Neighbourhoods of the center of Athens (Municipality of Athens) 

The Municipality of Athens, the City Centre of the Athens Urban Area, is divided into several districts: Omonoia, Syntagma, Exarcheia, Agios Nikolaos, Neapolis, Lykavittos, Lofos Strefi, Lofos Finopoulou, Lofos Filopappou, Pedion Areos, Metaxourgeio, Aghios Kostantinos, Larissa Station, Kerameikos, Psiri, Monastiraki, Gazi, Thission, Kapnikarea, Aghia Irini, Aerides, Anafiotika, Plaka, Acropolis, Pnyka, Makrygianni, Lofos Ardittou, Zappeion, Aghios Spyridon, Pangrati, Kolonaki, Dexameni, Evaggelismos, Gouva, Aghios Ioannis, Neos Kosmos, Koukaki, Kynosargous, Fix, Ano Petralona, Kato Petralona, Rouf, Votanikos, Profitis Daniil, Akadimia Platonos, Kolonos, Kolokynthou, Attikis Square, Lofos Skouze, Sepolia, Kypseli, Aghios Meletios, Nea Kypseli, Gyzi, Polygono, Ampelokipoi, Panormou-Gerokomeio, Pentagono, Ellinorosson, Nea Filothei, Ano Kypseli, Tourkovounia-Lofos Patatsou, Lofos Elikonos, Koliatsou, Thymarakia, Kato Patisia, Treis Gefyres, Aghios Eleftherios, Ano Patisia, Kypriadou, Menidi, Prompona, Aghios Panteleimonas, Pangrati, Goudi, Vyronas and Ilisia.

 Omonoia, Omonoia Square, is the oldest square in Athens. It is surrounded by hotels and fast food outlets, and contains a metro station, named Omonia station. The square is the focus for celebration of sporting victories, as seen after the country's winning of the Euro 2004 and the EuroBasket 2005 tournaments. 

 Metaxourgeio is a neighborhood of Athens. The neighborhood is located north of the historical centre of Athens, between Kolonos to the east and Kerameikos to the west, and north of Gazi. Metaxourgeio is frequently described as a transition neighborhood. After a long period of abandonment in the late 20th century, the area is acquiring a reputation as an artistic and fashionable neighborhood following the opening of art galleries, museums, restaurants and cafés. [1] Local efforts to beautify and invigorate the neighborhood have reinforced a sense of community and artistic expression. Anonymous art pieces containing quotes and statements in both English and Ancient Greek have sprung up throughout the neighborhood, bearing statements such as "Art for art's sake" (Τέχνη τέχνης χάριν). Guerrilla gardening has also helped to beautify the area.

 Psiri – The reviving Psiri neighbourhood – also known as Athens's "meat packing district" – is dotted with renovated former mansions, artists' spaces, and small gallery areas. A number of its renovated buildings also host fashionable bars, making it a hotspot for the city in the last decade, while live music restaurants known as "rebetadika", after rebetiko, a unique form of music that blossomed in Syros and Athens from the 1920s until the 1960s, are to be found. Rebetiko is admired by many, and as a result rebetadika are often crammed with people of all ages who will sing, dance and drink till dawn.
 The Gazi area, one of the latest in full redevelopment, is located around a historic gas factory, now converted into the Technopolis cultural multiplex, and also includes artists' areas, active nightlife and night clubs, small clubs, cafeterias, bars and restaurants, as well as Athens's "Gay village". The metro's expansion to the western suburbs of the city has brought easier access to the area since spring 2007, as the line 3 now stops at Gazi (Kerameikos station).
 Syntagma, Syntagma Square, (/Constitution Square), is the capital's central and largest square, lying adjacent to the Greek Parliament (the former Royal Palace) and the city's most notable hotels. Ermou Street, an approximately  pedestrian road connecting Syntagma Square to Monastiraki, is a consumer paradise for both Athenians and tourists. Complete with fashion shops and shopping centres promoting most international brands, it now finds itself in the top five most expensive shopping streets in Europe, and the tenth most expensive retail street in the world. Nearby, the renovated Army Fund building in Panepistimiou Street includes the "Attica" department store and several upmarket designer stores.

 Plaka, Monastiraki, and Thission – Plaka, lying just beneath the Acropolis, is famous for its plentiful neoclassical architecture, making up one of the most scenic districts of the city. It remains a prime tourist destination with tavernas, live performances and street salesmen. Nearby Monastiraki, for its part, is known for its string of small shops and markets, as well as its crowded flea market and tavernas specialising in souvlaki. Another district known for its student-crammed, stylish cafés is Theseum or Thission, lying just west of Monastiraki. Thission is home to the ancient Temple of Hephaestus, standing atop a small hill. This area also has a picturesque 11th-century Byzantine church, as well as a 15th-century Ottoman mosque.
 Exarcheia, located north of Kolonaki, often regarded as the city's anarchist scene and as a student quarter with night clubs, cafés, bars and bookshops. Exarcheia is home to the Athens Polytechnic and the National Archaeological Museum; it also contains important buildings of several 20th-century styles: Neoclassicism, Art Deco and Early Modernism (including Bauhaus influences).
 Kolonaki is the area at the base of Lycabettus hill, full of boutiques catering to well-heeled customers by day, and bars and more fashionable restaurants by night, with galleries and museums. This is often regarded as one of the more prestigious areas of the capital.

Parks and zoos 

Parnitha National Park is punctuated by well-marked paths, gorges, springs, torrents and caves dotting the protected area. Hiking and mountain-biking in all four mountains are popular outdoor activities for residents of the city. The National Garden of Athens was completed in 1840 and is a green refuge of 15.5 hectares in the centre of the Greek capital. It is to be found between the Parliament and Zappeion buildings, the latter of which maintains its own garden of seven hectares.

Parts of the City Centre have been redeveloped under a masterplan called the Unification of Archeological Sites of Athens, which has also gathered funding from the EU to help enhance the project. The landmark Dionysiou Areopagitou Street has been pedestrianised, forming a scenic route. The route starts from the Temple of Olympian Zeus at Vasilissis Olgas Avenue, continues under the southern slopes of the Acropolis near Plaka, and finishes just beyond the Temple of Hephaestus in Thiseio. The route in its entirety provides visitors with views of the Parthenon and the Agora (the meeting point of ancient Athenians), away from the busy City Centre.

The hills of Athens also provide green space. Lycabettus, Philopappos hill and the area around it, including Pnyx and Ardettos hill, are planted with pines and other trees, with the character of a small forest rather than typical metropolitan parkland. Also to be found is the Pedion tou Areos (Field of Mars) of 27.7 hectares, near the National Archaeological Museum.

Athens' largest zoo is the Attica Zoological Park, a 20-hectare (49-acre) private zoo located in the suburb of Spata. The zoo is home to around 2000 animals representing 400 species, and is open 365 days a year. Smaller zoos exist within public gardens or parks, such as the zoo within the National Garden of Athens.

Urban and suburban municipalities 

The Athens Metropolitan Area consists of 58 densely populated municipalities, sprawling around the Municipality of Athens (the City Centre) in virtually all directions. For the Athenians, all the urban municipalities surrounding the City Centre are called suburbs. According to their geographic location in relation to the City of Athens, the suburbs are divided into four zones; the northern suburbs (including Agios Stefanos, Dionysos, Ekali, Nea Erythraia, Kifissia, Kryoneri, Maroussi, Pefki, Lykovrysi, Metamorfosi, Nea Ionia, Nea Filadelfeia, Irakleio, Vrilissia, Melissia, Penteli, Chalandri, Agia Paraskevi, Gerakas, Pallini, Galatsi, Psychiko and Filothei); the southern suburbs (including Alimos, Nea Smyrni, Moschato, Tavros, Agios Ioannis Rentis, Kallithea, Piraeus, Agios Dimitrios, Palaio Faliro, Elliniko, Glyfada, Lagonisi, Saronida, Argyroupoli, Ilioupoli, Varkiza, Voula, Vari and Vouliagmeni); the eastern suburbs (including Zografou, Dafni, Vyronas, Kaisariani, Cholargos and Papagou); and the western suburbs (including Peristeri, Ilion, Egaleo, Koridallos, Agia Varvara, Keratsini, Perama, Nikaia, Drapetsona, Chaidari, Petroupoli, Agioi Anargyroi, Ano Liosia, Aspropyrgos, Eleusina, Acharnes and Kamatero).

In the northern suburb of Maroussi, the upgraded main Olympic Complex (known by its Greek acronym OAKA) dominates the skyline. The area has been redeveloped according to a design by the Spanish architect Santiago Calatrava, with steel arches, landscaped gardens, fountains, futuristic glass, and a landmark new blue glass roof which was added to the main stadium. A second Olympic complex, next to the sea at the beach of Palaio Faliro, also features modern stadia, shops and an elevated esplanade. Work is underway to transform the grounds of the old Athens Airport – named Elliniko – in the southern suburbs, into one of the largest landscaped parks in Europe, to be named the Hellenikon Metropolitan Park.

Many of the southern suburbs (such as Alimos, Palaio Faliro, Elliniko, Glyfada, Voula, Vouliagmeni and Varkiza) known as the Athens Riviera, host a number of sandy beaches, most of which are operated by the Greek National Tourism Organisation and require an entrance fee.

Administration 

The large City Centre of the Greek capital falls directly within the Municipality of Athens or Athens Municipality—also City of Athens. Athens Municipality is the largest in population size in Greece. Piraeus also forms a significant city centre on its own, within the Athens Urban Area and it is the second largest in population size within it.

Athens Urban Area 

The Athens Urban Area, also known as Urban Area of the Capital or Greater Athens, today consists of 40 municipalities, 35 of which make up what was referred to as the former Athens Prefecture municipalities, located within 4 regional units (North Athens, West Athens, Central Athens, South Athens); and a further 5 municipalities, which make up the former Piraeus Prefecture municipalities, located within the regional unit of Piraeus as mentioned above.

Until 2010, which made up the abolished Athens Prefecture and the municipality of Piraeus, the historic Athenian port, with 4 other municipalities make up the regional unit of Piraeus.

The Athens Urban Area is considered to form the city of Athens as a whole, despite its administrative divisions, which is the largest in Greece and one of the most populated urban areas in Europe.

Athens metropolitan area

The Athens metropolitan area spans  within the Attica region and includes a total of 58 municipalities, which are organized in seven regional units (those outlined above, along with East Attica and West Attica), having reached a population of 3,744,059 according to the 2021 census. Athens and Piraeus municipalities serve as the two metropolitan centres of the Athens Metropolitan Area. There are also some inter-municipal centres serving specific areas. For example, Kifissia and Glyfada serve as inter-municipal centres for northern and southern suburbs respectively.

Demographics

Population in modern times 

The Municipality of Athens has an official population of 643,452 people (in 2021). According to the 2021 Population and Housing Census, The four regional units that make up what is referred to as Greater Athens have a combined population of  2,611,713 . They together with the regional unit of Piraeus (Greater Piraeus) make up the dense Athens Urban Area which reaches a total population of 3,059,764 inhabitants (in 2021). According to Eurostat, in 2013 the functional urban area of Athens had 3,828,434 inhabitants, being apparently decreasing compared with the pre-economic crisis date of 2009 (4,164,175).

The incumbent Mayor of Athens is Kostas Bakoyannis of New Democracy. The municipality is divided into seven municipal districts which are mainly used for administrative purposes.

As of the 2011 census, the population for each of the seven municipal districts of Athens is as follows:

 1st: 75,810
 2nd: 103,004
 3rd: 46,508
 4th: 85,629
 5th: 98,665
 6th: 130,582
 7th: 123,848

For the Athenians the most popular way of dividing the downtown is through its neighbourhoods such as Pagkrati, Ampelokipoi, Goudi, Exarcheia, Patisia, Ilisia, Petralona, Plaka, Anafiotika, Koukaki, Kolonaki and Kypseli, each with its own distinct history and characteristics.

Population of the Athens Metropolitan Area 
It actually sprawls over the whole peninsula of Attica, which is the best part of the region of Attica, excluding the islands.

Population in ancient times 
Mycenean Athens in 1600–1100 BCE could have equalled the size of Tiryns, with an estimated population of up to 10,000–15,000. During the Greek Dark Ages the population of Athens was around 4,000 people, rising to an estimated 10,000 by 700 BCE.

During the Classical period, Athens denotes both the urban area of the city proper and its subject territory (the Athenian city-state) extending across most of the modern Attica region except the territory of the city-state of Megaris and the island section. In 500 BCE the Athenian territory probably contained around 200,000 people. Thucydides indicates a fifth-century total of 150,000-350,000 and up to 610,000. A census ordered by Demetrius of Phalerum in 317 BCE is said to have recorded 21,000 free citizens, 10,000 resident aliens and 400,000 slaves, a total population of 431,000, but this figure is highly suspect because of the improbably high number of slaves and does not include free women and children and resident foreigners. An estimate based on Thucydides is 40,000 male citizens, 100,000 family members, 70,000 metics (resident foreigners) and 150,000-400,000 slaves, though modern historians again hesitate to take such high numbers at face value, most estimates now preferring a total in the 200–350,000 range. The urban area of Athens proper (excluding the port of Piraeus) covered less than a thousandth of the area of the city-state, though its population density was of course far higher: modern estimates for the population of the built-up area tend to indicate around 35–45,000 inhabitants, though density of occupation, household size and whether there was a significant suburban population beyond the walls remain uncertain.

The ancient site of the main city is centred on the rocky hill of the acropolis. Many towns existed in the Athenian territory. Acharnae, Afidnes, Cytherus, Colonus, Corydallus, Cropia, Decelea, Euonymos, Vravron among others were important towns in the Athenian countryside. The new port of Piraeus was located in the site between the passenger section of the modern port (named Kantharos in antiquity) and Pasalimani harbour (named Zea in antiquity). The old port (Phaliro) was in the site of modern Palaio Faliro and gradually declined after the construction of the new port, but remained as a minor port and important settlement with historic significance in late Classical times.

Modern Expansion

The rapid expansion of the modern city, which continues to this day, took off with industrial growth in the 1950s and 1960s. The expansion is now particularly toward the East and North East (a tendency greatly related to the new Eleftherios Venizelos International Airport and the Attiki Odos, the freeway that cuts across Attica). By this process Athens has engulfed many former suburbs and villages in Attica, and continues to do so. The table below shows the historical population of Athens in recent times.

The metropolitan population reached a peak around 2006 and since then has stabilised and even dropped slightly at around 3.7 million.

Government and politics 
Athens became the capital of Greece in 1834, following Nafplion, which was the provisional capital from 1829. The municipality (City) of Athens is also the capital of the Attica region. The term Athens can refer either to the Municipality of Athens, to Greater Athens or urban area, or to the entire Athens Metropolitan Area.

International relations and influence

Twin towns – sister cities 
Athens is twinned with:

Partnerships 
  Belgrade, Serbia (1966)
  Paris, France (2000)
  Ljubljana, Slovenia
  Naples, Italy
  Yerevan, Armenia (1993)

Other locations named after Athens 
  United States

  Canada
 Athens Township, Ontario (pop. 3,086)    
  Costa Rica
 Atenas (pop. 7,716)
 Atenas (canton) (pop. 23,743)

  Germany
 Athenstedt, Saxony-Anhalt (pop. 431) 

  Honduras
 Atenas De San Cristóbal, Atlántida
  Italy
 Atena Lucana, Province of Salerno, Campania (pop. 2,344)
 Atina, Province of Frosinone, Lazio (pop. 4,480)
  Poland
 Ateny, Podlaskie Voivodeship (pop. 40)
  Ukraine
 Afini (Zoria – Зоря), Donetsk (pop. 200)

Economy 

Athens is the financial capital of Greece. According to data from 2014, Athens as a metropolitan economic area produced US$130 billion as GDP in PPP, which consists of nearly half of the production for the whole country. Athens was ranked 102nd in that year's list of global economic metropolises, while GDP per capita for the same year was 32,000 US-dollars.

Athens is one of the major economic centres in south-eastern Europe and is considered a regional economic power. The port of Piraeus, where big investments by COSCO have already been delivered during the recent decade, the completion of the new Cargo Centre in Thriasion, the expansion of the Athens Metro and the Athens Tram, as well as the Hellenikon metropolitan park redevelopment in Elliniko and other urban projects, are the economic landmarks of the upcoming years.

Prominent Greek companies such as Hellas Sat, Hellenic Aerospace Industry, Mytilineos Holdings, Titan Cement, Hellenic Petroleum, Papadopoulos E.J., Folli Follie, Jumbo S.A., OPAP, and Cosmote have their headquarters in the metropolitan area of Athens. Multinational companies such as Ericsson, Sony, Siemens, Motorola, Samsung, Microsoft, Teleperformance, Novartis, Mondelez and Coca-Cola also have their regional research and development headquarters in the city.

The banking sector is represented by National Bank of Greece, Alpha Bank, Eurobank, and Piraeus Bank, while the Bank of Greece is also situated in the City Centre. The Athens Stock Exchange was severely hit by the Greek government-debt crisis and the decision of the government to proceed into capital controls during summer 2015. As a whole the economy of Athens and Greece was strongly affected, while data showed a change from long recession to growth of 1.4% from 2017 onwards.

Tourism is also a leading contributor to the economy of the city, as one of Europe's top destinations for city-break tourism, and also the gateway for excursions to both the islands and other parts of the mainland. Greece attracted 26.5 million visitors in 2015, 30.1 million visitors in 2017, and over 33 million in 2018, making Greece one of the most visited countries in Europe and the world, and contributing 18% to the country's GDP. Athens welcomed more than 5 million tourists in 2018, and 1.4 million were "city-breakers"; this was an increase by over a million city-breakers since 2013.

Transport 

Athens is the country's major transportation hub. The city has Greece's largest airport and its largest port; Piraeus, too, is the largest container transport port in the Mediterranean, and the largest passenger port in Europe.

Athens is a major national hub for Intercity (Ktel) and international buses, as well as for domestic and international rail transport. Public transport is serviced by a variety of transportation means, making up the country's largest mass transit system. The Athens Mass Transit System consists of a large bus and trolleybus fleet, the city's Metro, a Suburban Railway service and a tram network, connecting the southern suburbs to the city centre.

Bus transport 
OSY (Odikes Sygkoinonies S.A.), a subsidiary company of OASA (Athens urban transport organisation), is the main operator of buses and trolleybuses in Athens. As of 2017, its network consists of around 322 bus lines, spanning the Athens Metropolitan Area, and making up a fleet of 2,375 buses and trolleybuses. Of those 2,375, 619 buses run on compressed natural gas, making up the largest fleet of natural gas-powered buses in Europe, and 354 are electric-powered (trolleybuses). All of the 354 trolleybuses are equipped to run on diesel in case of power failure.

International links are provided by a number of private companies. National and regional bus links are provided by KTEL from two InterCity Bus Terminals; Kifissos Bus Terminal A and Liosion Bus Terminal B, both located in the north-western part of the city. Kifissos provides connections towards Peloponnese, North Greece, West Greece and some Ionian Islands, whereas Liosion is used for most of Central Greece.

Athens Metro 

The Athens Metro is operated by STASY S.A (Statheres Sygkoinonies S.A), a subsidiary company of OASA (Athens urban transport organisation), which provides public transport throughout the Athens Urban Area. While its main purpose is transport, it also houses Greek artifacts found during the construction of the system. The Athens Metro runs three metro lines, namely Line 1 (Green Line), Line 2 (Red Line) and Line 3 (Blue Line) lines, of which the first was constructed in 1869, and the other two largely during the 1990s, with the initial new sections opened in January 2000. Line 1 mostly runs at ground level and the other two (Line 2 & 3) routes run entirely underground. A fleet of 42 trains, using 252 carriages, operates on the network, with a daily occupancy of 1,353,000 passengers.

Line 1 (Green Line) serves 24 stations, and is the oldest line of the Athens metro network. There are transfer connections with the Blue Line 3 at Monastiraki station and with the Red Line 2 at Omonia and Attiki stations.

The line connects the western suburbs of Athens with the southeast suburbs, passing through the center of Athens. The Red Line has transfer connections with the Green Line 1 at Attiki and Omonia stations. There are also transfer connections with the Blue Line 3 at Syntagma station and with the tram at Syntagma, Syngrou Fix and Neos Kosmos stations.

Line 3 (Blue Line) runs from Nikaia station, through the central Monastiraki and Syntagma stations to Doukissis Plakentias avenue in the northeastern suburb of Halandri. The spring 2007 extension from Monastiraki westwards to Egaleo connected some of the main night life hubs of the city, namely those of Gazi (Kerameikos station) with Psirri (Monastiraki station) and the city centre (Syntagma station). Extensions are under construction to the western and southwestern suburbs of Athens, as far as the Port of Piraeus. The new stations will be Maniatika, Piraeus and Dimotiko Theatro, and the completed extension will be ready in 2022, connecting the biggest port of Greece, the Port of Piraeus, with Athens International Airport, the biggest airport of Greece.

Commuter/suburban rail (Proastiakos) 

Tram 

The Athens Tram is operated by STASY S.A (Statheres Sygkoinonies S.A), a subsidiary company of OASA (Athens urban transport organisation). It has a fleet of 35 Sirio type vehicles which serve 48 stations, employ 345 people with an average daily occupancy of 65,000 passengers. The network runs from Syntagma Square to the southwestern suburb of Palaio Faliro, where the line splits in two branches; the first runs along the Athens coastline toward the southern suburb of Voula, while the other heads toward Neo Faliro. The network covers the majority of the Athens coastline. Further extension is under construction towards the major commercial port of Piraeus.

Athens International Airport 

The airport, awarded the "European Airport of the Year 2004" Award, is intended as an expandable hub for air travel in southeastern Europe and was constructed in 51 months, costing 2.2 billion euros. It employs a staff of 14,000.

Railways and ferry connections 
Athens is the hub of the country's national railway system (OSE), connecting the capital with major cities across Greece and abroad (Istanbul, Sofia, Belgrade and Bucharest). The Port of Piraeus is the largest port in Greece and one of the largest in Europe.

Rafina and Lavrio act as alternative ports of Athens, connects the city with numerous Greek islands of the Aegean Sea, Evia and Çeşme in Turkey, while also serving the cruise ships that arrive.

Motorways 

Two main motorways of Greece begin in Athens, namely the A1/E75, heading north towards Greece's second largest city, Thessaloniki; and the border crossing of Evzones and the A8/E94 heading west, towards Greece's third largest city, Patras, which incorporated the GR-8A. Before their completion much of the road traffic used the GR-1 and the GR-8.

Athens' Metropolitan Area is served by the motorway network of the Attiki Odos toll-motorway (code: A6). Its main section extends from the western industrial suburb of Elefsina to Athens International Airport; while two beltways, namely the Aigaleo Beltway (A65) and the Hymettus Beltway (A64) serve parts of western and eastern Athens respectively.
 Motorways:
 A1/E75 N (Lamia, Larissa, Thessaloniki)
 A8 (GR-8A)/E94 W (Elefsina, Corinth, Patras)
 A6 W (Elefsina) E (Airport)
 National roads:
 GR-1 Ν (Lamia, Larissa, Thessaloniki)
 GR-8 W (Corinth, Patras)
 GR-3 N (Elefsina, Lamia, Larissa)

Education 

Located on Panepistimiou Street, the old campus of the University of Athens, the National Library, and the Athens Academy form the "Athens Trilogy" built in the mid-19th century. The largest and oldest university in Athens is the National and Kapodistrian University of Athens. Most of the functions of NKUA have been transferred to a campus in the eastern suburb of Zografou. The National Technical University of Athens is located on Patision Street.

The University of West Attica is the second largest university in Athens. The seat of the university is located in the western area of Athens, where the philosophers of Ancient Athens delivered lectures. All the activities of UNIWA are carried out in the modern infrastructure of the three University Campuses within the metropolitan region of Athens (Egaleo Park, Ancient Olive Groove and Athens), which offer modern teaching and research spaces, entertainment and support facilities for all students.
Other universities that lie within Athens are the Athens University of Economics and Business, the Panteion University, the Agricultural University of Athens and the University of Piraeus. There are overall ten state-supported Institutions of Higher (or Tertiary) education located in the Athens Urban Area, these are by chronological order: Athens School of Fine Arts (1837), National Technical University of Athens (1837), National and Kapodistrian University of Athens (1837), Agricultural University of Athens (1920), Athens University of Economics and Business (1920), Panteion University of Social and Political Sciences (1927), University of Piraeus (1938), Harokopio University of Athens (1990), School of Pedagogical and Technological Education (2002), University of West Attica (2018). There are also several other private colleges, as they called formally in Greece, as the establishment of private universities is prohibited by the constitution. Many of them are accredited by a foreign state or university such as the American College of Greece and the Athens Campus of the University of Indianapolis.

Culture

Archaeological hub 

The city is a world centre of archaeological research. Alongside national academic institutions, such as the Athens University and the Archaeological Society, it is home to multiple archaeological museums, taking in the National Archaeological Museum, the Cycladic Museum, the Epigraphic Museum, the Byzantine & Christian Museum, as well as museums at the ancient Agora, Acropolis, Kerameikos, and the Kerameikos Archaeological Museum. The city is also the setting for the Demokritos laboratory for Archaeometry, alongside regional and national archaeological authorities forming part of the Greek Department of Culture.

Athens hosts 17 Foreign Archaeological Institutes which promote and facilitate research by scholars from their home countries. As a result, Athens has more than a dozen archaeological libraries and three specialized archaeological laboratories, and is the venue of several hundred specialized lectures, conferences and seminars, as well as dozens of archaeological exhibitions each year. At any given time, hundreds of international scholars and researchers in all disciplines of archaeology are to be found in the city.

Architecture 

Athens incorporates architectural styles ranging from Greco-Roman and Neoclassical to Modern. They are often to be found in the same areas, as Athens is not marked by a uniformity of architectural style. A visitor will quickly notice the absence of tall buildings: Athens has very strict height restriction laws in order to ensure the Acropolis hill is visible throughout the city. Despite the variety in styles, there is evidence of continuity in elements of the architectural environment through the city's history.

For the greatest part of the 19th century Neoclassicism dominated Athens, as well as some deviations from it such as Eclecticism, especially in the early 20th century. Thus, the Old Royal Palace was the first important public building to be built, between 1836 and 1843. Later in the mid and late 19th century, Theophil Freiherr von Hansen and Ernst Ziller took part in the construction of many neoclassical buildings such as the Athens Academy and the Zappeion Hall. Ziller also designed many private mansions in the centre of Athens which gradually became public, usually through donations, such as Schliemann's Iliou Melathron.

Beginning in the 1920s, modern architecture including Bauhaus and Art Deco began to exert an influence on almost all Greek architects, and buildings both public and private were constructed in accordance with these styles. Localities with a great number of such buildings include Kolonaki, and some areas of the centre of the city; neighbourhoods developed in this period include Kypseli.

In the 1950s and 1960s during the extension and development of Athens, other modern movements such as the International style played an important role. The centre of Athens was largely rebuilt, leading to the demolition of a number of neoclassical buildings. The architects of this era employed materials such as glass, marble and aluminium, and many blended modern and classical elements. After World War II, internationally known architects to have designed and built in the city included Walter Gropius, with his design for the US Embassy, and, among others, Eero Saarinen, in his postwar design for the east terminal of the Ellinikon Airport.

Urban sculpture 

Across the city numerous statues or busts are to be found. Apart from the neoclassicals by Leonidas Drosis at the Academy of Athens (Plato, Socrates, Apollo and Athena), others in notable categories include the statue of Theseus by Georgios Fytalis at Thiseion; depictions of philhellenes such as Lord Byron, George Canning, and William Gladstone; the equestrian statue of Theodoros Kolokotronis by Lazaros Sochos in front of the Old Parliament; statues of Ioannis Kapodistrias, Rigas Feraios and Adamantios Korais at the University; of Evangelos Zappas and Konstantinos Zappas at the Zappeion; Ioannis Varvakis at the National Garden; the" Woodbreaker" by Dimitrios Filippotis; the equestrian statue of Alexandros Papagos in the Papagou district; and various busts of fighters of Greek independence at the Pedion tou Areos. A significant landmark is also the Tomb of the Unknown Soldier in Syntagma.

Museums 

Athens' most important museums include:
 the National Archaeological Museum, the largest archaeological museum in the country, and one of the most important internationally, as it contains a vast collection of antiquities. Its artefacts cover a period of more than 5,000 years, from late Neolithic Age to Roman Greece;
 the Benaki Museum with its several branches for each of its collections including ancient, Byzantine, Ottoman-era, Chinese art and beyond;
 the Byzantine and Christian Museum, one of the most important museums of Byzantine art;
 the National Art Gallery, the nation's eponymous leading gallery, which reopened in 2021 after renovation;
 the National Museum of Contemporary Art, which opened in 2000 in a former brewery building;
 the Numismatic Museum, housing a major collection of ancient and modern coins;
 the Museum of Cycladic Art, home to an extensive collection of Cycladic art, including its famous figurines of white marble;
 the New Acropolis Museum, opened in 2009, and replacing the old museum on the Acropolis. The new museum has proved considerably popular; almost one million people visited during the summer period June–October 2009 alone. A number of smaller and privately owned museums focused on Greek culture and arts are also to be found.
 the Kerameikos Archaeological Museum, a museum which displays artifacts from the burial site of Kerameikos. Much of the pottery and other artifacts relate to Athenian attitudes towards death and the afterlife, throughout many ages.
 the Jewish Museum of Greece, a museum which describes the history and culture of the Greek Jewish community.

Tourism 
Athens has been a destination for travellers since antiquity. Over the past decade, the city's infrastructure and social amenities have improved, in part because of its successful bid to stage the 2004 Olympic Games. The Greek Government, aided by the EU, has funded major infrastructure projects such as the state-of-the-art Eleftherios Venizelos International Airport, the expansion of the Athens Metro system, and the new Attiki Odos Motorway.

Entertainment and performing arts 

Athens is home to 148 theatrical stages, more than any other city in the world, including the ancient Odeon of Herodes Atticus, home to the Athens Festival, which runs from May to October each year. In addition to a large number of multiplexes, Athens plays host to open air garden cinemas. The city also supports music venues, including the Athens Concert Hall (Megaro Moussikis), which attracts world class artists. The Athens Planetarium, located in Andrea Syngrou Avenue, in Palaio Faliro is one of the largest and best equipped digital planetaria in the world. The Stavros Niarchos Foundation Cultural Center, inaugurated in 2016, will house the National Library of Greece and the Greek National Opera. In 2018 Athens was designated as the World Book Capital by UNESCO.

Restaurants, tavernas and bars can be found in the entertainment hubs in Plaka and the Trigono areas of the historic centre, the inner suburbs of Gazi and Psyrri are especially busy with nightclubs and bars, while Kolonaki, Exarchia, Metaxourgeio, Koukaki and Pangrati offer more of a cafe and restaurant scene. The coastal suburbs of Microlimano, Alimos and Glyfada include many tavernas, beach bars and busy summer clubs.

Music

The most successful songs during the period 1870–1930 were the so-called Athenian serenades (Αθηναϊκές καντάδες), based on the Heptanesean kantádhes (καντάδες 'serenades'; sing.: καντάδα) and the songs performed on stage (επιθεωρησιακά τραγούδια 'theatrical revue songs') in revues, musical comedies, operettas and nocturnes that were dominating Athens' theatre scene.

Notable composers of operettas or nocturnes were Kostas Giannidis, Dionysios Lavrangas, Nikos Hatziapostolou, while Theophrastos Sakellaridis' The Godson remains probably the most popular operetta. Despite the fact that the Athenian songs were not autonomous artistic creations (in contrast with the serenades) and despite their original connection with mainly dramatic forms of art, they eventually became hits as independent songs. Notable actors of Greek operettas, who made also a series of melodies and songs popular at the time, include Orestis Makris, the Kalouta sisters, Vasilis Avlonitis, Afroditi Laoutari, Eleni Papadaki, Marika Nezer, Marika Krevata and others. After 1930, receptive to both American and other European musical influences as well as the homegrown musical tradition, Greek composers begin to write music using elements of the tango, waltz, swing, foxtrot, sometimes combined with melodies in the style of Athenian serenades' repertory. Nikos Gounaris was probably the most renowned composer and singer of this time.

In 1922, following the war, genocide and later population exchange suffered by the Greek population of Asia Minor, many ethnic Greeks fled to Athens. They settled in poor neighbourhoods and brought with them Rebetiko music, making it also popular in Greece, and which later became the base for the Laïko music. Other forms of song popular today in Greece are elafrolaika, entechno, dimotika, and skyladika. Greece's most notable, and internationally famous, composers of Greek song, mainly of the entechno form, are Manos Hadjidakis and Mikis Theodorakis. Both composers have achieved fame abroad for their composition of film scores.

Sports 
Athens has a long tradition in sports and sporting events, serving as home to the most important clubs in Greek sport and housing a large number of sports facilities. The city has also been host to sports events of international importance.

Athens has hosted the Summer Olympic Games twice, in 1896 and 2004. The 2004 Summer Olympics required the development of the Athens Olympic Stadium, which has since gained a reputation as one of the most beautiful stadiums in the world, and one of its most interesting modern monuments. The biggest stadium in the country, it hosted two finals of the UEFA Champions League, in 1994 and 2007. Athens' other major stadium, located in the Piraeus area, is the Karaiskakis Stadium, a sports and entertainment complex, host of the 1971 UEFA Cup Winners' Cup Final.

Athens has hosted the EuroLeague final three times, the first in 1985 and second in 1993, both at the Peace and Friendship Stadium, most known as SEF, a large indoor arena, and the third time in 2007 at the Olympic Indoor Hall. Events in other sports such as athletics, volleyball, water polo etc., have been hosted in the capital's venues.

Athens is home to three European multi-sport clubs: Panathinaikos, originated in Athens city centre, Olympiacos, originated in the suburb of Piraeus and AEK Athens, originated in the suburb of Nea Filadelfeia. In football, Panathinaikos made it to the 1971 European Cup Final, Olympiacos have dominated domestic competitions, while AEK Athens is the other member of the big three. These clubs also have basketball teams; Panathinaikos and Olympiacos are among the top powers in European basketball, having won the Euroleague six times and three respectively, whilst AEK Athens was the first Greek team to win a European trophy in any team sport.

Other notable clubs within Athens are Athinaikos, Panionios, Atromitos, Apollon, Panellinios, Egaleo F.C., Ethnikos Piraeus, Maroussi BCE and Peristeri B.C. Athenian clubs have also had domestic and international success in other sports.

The Athens area encompasses a variety of terrain, notably hills and mountains rising around the city, and the capital is the only major city in Europe to be bisected by a mountain range. Four mountain ranges extend into city boundaries and thousands of kilometres of trails criss-cross the city and neighbouring areas, providing exercise and wilderness access on foot and bike.

Beyond Athens and across the prefecture of Attica, outdoor activities include skiing, rock climbing, hang gliding and windsurfing. Numerous outdoor clubs serve these sports, including the Athens Chapter of the Sierra Club, which leads over 4,000 outings annually in the area.

Sports clubs 

Beside the above clubs, inside the boundaries of Athens Municipality there are some more clubs with presence in national divisions or notable action for short periods. Another important Athenian sport club is the Athens Tennis Club founded in 1895 with important offer for the Greek tennis.

Olympic Games

1896 Summer Olympics 

The revival of the modern Olympic Games was brought forth in 1896, by Frenchman Pierre de Coubertin. Thanks to his efforts, Athens was awarded the first modern Olympic Games. In 1896, the city had a population of 123,000 and the event helped boost the city's international profile. Of the venues used for these Olympics, the Kallimarmaro Stadium, and Zappeion were most crucial. The Kallimarmaro is a replica of the ancient Athenian stadiums, and the only major stadium (in its capacity of 60,000) to be made entirely of white marble from Mount Penteli, the same material used for construction of the Parthenon.

1906 Summer Olympics 

The 1906 Summer Olympics, or the 1906 Intercalated games, were held in Athens. The intercalated competitions were intermediate games to the internationally organized Olympics, and were meant to be organized in Greece every four years, between the main Olympics. This idea later lost support from the IOC and these games were discontinued.

2004 Summer Olympics 

Athens was awarded the 2004 Summer Olympics on 5 September 1997 in Lausanne, Switzerland, after having lost a previous bid to host the 1996 Summer Olympics, to Atlanta, United States. It was to be the second time Athens would host the games, following the inaugural event of 1896. After an unsuccessful bid in 1990, the 1997 bid was radically improved, including an appeal to Greece's Olympic history. In the last round of voting, Athens defeated Rome with 66 votes to 41. Prior to this round, the cities of Buenos Aires, Stockholm and Cape Town had been eliminated from competition, having received fewer votes.

During the first three years of preparations, the International Olympic Committee had expressed concern over the speed of construction progress for some of the new Olympic venues. In 2000, the Organising Committee's president was replaced by Gianna Angelopoulos-Daskalaki, who was the president of the original Bidding Committee in 1997. From that point forward, preparations continued at a highly accelerated, almost frenzied pace.

Although the heavy cost was criticized, estimated at $1.5 billion, Athens was transformed into a more functional city that enjoys modern technology both in transportation and in modern urban development. The games welcomed over 10,000 athletes from all 202 countries.

The 2004 Games were judged a success, as both security and organization worked well, and only a few visitors reported minor problems mainly concerning accommodation issues. The 2004 Olympic Games were described as "unforgettable, dream games", by IOC President Jacques Rogge for their return to the birthplace of the Olympics, and for meeting the challenges of holding the Olympic Games. The only observable problem was a somewhat sparse attendance of some early events. Eventually, however, a total of more than 3.5 million tickets were sold, which was higher than any other Olympics with the exception of Sydney (more than 5 million tickets were sold there in 2000).

In 2008, it was reported that most of the Olympic venues had fallen into disrepair: according to those reports, 21 of the 22 facilities built for the games had either been left abandoned or are in a state of dereliction, with several squatter camps having sprung up around certain facilities, and a number of venues afflicted by vandalism, graffiti or strewn with rubbish. These claims were disputed and are likely to be inaccurate, as most of the facilities used for the Athens Olympics are either in use or in the process of being converted for post-Olympics use. The Greek Government has created a corporation, Olympic Properties SA, which is overseeing the post-Olympics management, development and conversion of these facilities, some of which will be sold off (or have already been sold off) to the private sector, while other facilities are still in use just as during the Olympics, or have been converted for commercial use or modified for other sports. Concerts and theatrical shows, such as those by the troupe Cirque du Soleil, have recently been held in the complex.

See also 
 Outline of Athens
 Timeline of Athens

References

External links 

 Official website of the Municipality of Athens

 
Ancient Greek archaeological sites in Greece
Archaeological sites in Attica
Capitals in Europe
Capitals of Greek states
City-states
Greek regional capitals
Populated coastal places in Greece
Populated places established in the 5th century BC
Populated places in ancient Greece
Populated places in Central Athens (regional unit)
Roman sites in Greece